Chantons sous l'Occupation is a French documentary film from 1976. It was directed and written by André Halimi, starring Pascal Mazzotti, Maître Naud, and Fabienne Jamet.

The film tells about artists and entertainers (from Jean Cocteau to Maurice Chevalier) under the Nazi occupation of France (1940-1944). It presents the entire spectrum from resisters to semi-fascists.

Cast 
 Maître Naud: himself
 Veit Relin: herself
 Manouche: herself
 Maître Weil-Curiel: himself
 Maurice Bardèche: himself
 Michel Audiard: himself
 Maud de Belleroche: herself
 André Pousse: himself
 Dominique Aury: herself
 Jean Marais: himself
 Arno Breker: himself
 Edouard Nessler: himself
 Jean-Louis Bory: himself
 Marc Doelnitz: himself

See also 
 Milice, film noir

References

External links 
 
 
 
 Chantons sous l'Occupation (1976) at Allogine.com
 CHANTONS SOUS L'OCCUPATION FILM D'ANDRÉ HALIMI at Alliancefr.com

1976 films
French documentary films
1970s French-language films
1976 documentary films
Documentary films about World War II
Documentary films about music and musicians
1970s French films